Notzilla is a 2020 American monster comedy film written and directed by Mitch Teemley. A parody of kaiju films, particularly those in the Godzilla franchise, the film stars Frederic Eng-Li, Tifani Ahren Davis, Tim Bensch, Samantha Russell, and Michael Bath.

Plot 
In 1962, the JSDF kills a mother kaiju, Notzilla, despite the protestations of paleontologist Dr. Itchihiro "Hiro" Honda, who believes he can restore her to her normal, smaller size. He rescues her egg, and takes it to Ohio, but accidentally flushes it down the jet-powered airplane toilet. Ejected from the plane, it falls into the Ohio River. The scientists of Cincinnati's Secret Nuclear Underground Government Installation (SNUGI) convene, conducted by SNUGI's head, Dr. Richard Blowheart. After another nuclear reactor test ends in an explosion, Richard and his assistant Dr. Shirley Yujest spot the Notzilla egg in the river, and Richard takes it. It's explained that when the species "Notzillasaurus Partiontildon" consumes alcohol it grows to abnormal proportions. Later that day the Notzilla hatches, and immediately begins dinking all of Richard's beer.

Notzilla continues to grow, and escapes. Hiro wants to save the monster, while Richard wants to exterminate him. The SNUGI scientists search for him in their research vessel the Pseudoscientifica. When the now-immense Notzilla surfaces, a stowaway, Bobby, believing Notzilla has killed his grandfather, leaps onto his back with a handgun. Upon learning his grandfather is still alive, Bobby throws the handgun onto the deck. The sound startles Notzilla, who rushes away.

Hiro admits he was responsible for Notzilla coming to America. Richard contacts The Pentagon for help in destroying Notzilla, but as most of the armed forces are preoccupied with the Cuban Missile Crisis, he can only reach Frigidair General Dirk Bogus, “head of military refrigeration for all of Southwestern Ohio.” Rockets, shells, and missiles have no effect on Notzilla, who knocks over vehicles and soldiers "as if they were nothing but toys!" A squadron of fighter jets arrives, but Notzilla grabs and cuts the wires they are hanging from. Planning to follow the monster to Cincinnati, Bogus asks Richard if SNUGI happens to have any super-secret weapons lying around, prompting Richard to unveil his Super-Secret Uber-Fission Mega Blaster.

Hiro confronts Richard, who mentions that, as a side effect, his weapon will irradiate Cincinnati for the next 50 years. Hiro, who has a black belt in haiku, immobilizes Richard by reciting profoundly beautiful poetry. Shirley shares with Hiro her theory of "warm fusion," which potentially holds the key to returning Notzilla to his normal size.

Notzilla menaces a train by peeling the "passengers" off its backlit windows, while Hiro joins forces with local brewmeister Fritz Übertrinker, using Shirley's warm fusion to develop an "anti-beer" formula. Despite the danger to Cincinnati, Richard rallies his colleagues to help him build his Mega-Blaster. Bogus faces Notzilla again, but fails. As the two teams of scientists continue their work, Bogus sets another ineffective trap for the monster with high-tension wires; with a blimp tucked under his arm, the monster runs a "touchdown" under the wires. Notzilla then makes his way through the streets of Cincinnati, emitting fiery burps. He picks up Shirley, but she manages to communicate with him, directing him to put out the fires he's set (unfortunately, he does so with a spray of urine). Then setting her down, he leaves the city.

Shirley returns to SNUGI and reveals Richard's secret: he's not a real scientist, but former child movie star Donnie Draper. This delights Dr. Butay, but horrifies the other physicists. Shirley encourages them to sabotage the Mega-Blaster. Richard/Donnie unveils the weapon at Big Finale Ridge and Dr. Butay aims it toward the city, but it shorts-out (sabotaged by the other scientists). Notzilla arrives and presents Shirley with a bouquet of trees. Hiro shows up in a flatbed truck, with the anti-beer formula stored inside an enormous beer can. Drinking it, Notzilla is reduced to his natural size, to the delight of nearly all.  Dr. Butay, however, unveils a super-secret alternative power switch. As Richard/Donnie reaches to push the button, the rest of the cast leaps in front of the monster, declaring (a la Spartacus) that they too are Notzilla. Hiro rams the beer can with the truck, knocking it into the death-ray's path, causing it to spray the formula onto Butay and Richard/Donnie. As a result, both shrink to the size of dolls. 4-Star General Specific arrives, tipped off by ace reporter Pearl Stringer. Gen. Specific appoints Shirley as the new head of SNUGI, and Hiro as director of the Pentagon's nascent Giant Monster Protection Program, tasked with protecting the world from "sequels!"

In the aftermath, Shirley and Hiro adopt Notzilla, who carries around Dr. Butay and Donnie in a toy car. Hiro asks Shirley about adopting more kids, just as three new Notzilla eggs float ashore.

Cast
 Frederic Eng-Li as Prof. Hiro Honda
 Tifani Ahren Davis as Dr. Shirley Yujest
 Tim Bensch as Dr. Richard Blowheart
 Samantha Russell as Pearl Stringer
 Michael Bath as Gen. Dirk Bogus
 Becca Kravitz as Dr. Jacques Butay
 Spencer Lackey as Bobby Bleech

Release
Notzilla had its world premiere at G-Fest XXVI in Rosemont, Illinois, In July 2019, followed by film festival appearances (see Accolades below). It was officially released on Amazon Prime in August 2020  and has since expanded to Blu-ray and DVD release, as well as additional streaming services worldwide.

Reception 
Upon its release, Kevin Burwick of MovieWeb called Notzilla "a spoof with a hint of Gremlins" that "looks like it could be a cult classic." Bradley Gibson, writing for Film Threat said, "It might have worked better as a short, as there’s just not enough juice here to sustain a feature-length production" giving Notzilla a 6/10 rating. Viewers on Amazon Prime give it a 4.3 out 5, comparing it to Airplane!, and reminiscing about the 50s and 60s "creature features" it spoofs.

Accolades

References

External links
 

2010s parody films
2010s monster movies
American parody films
American monster movies
Giant monster films
Kaiju films
2010s English-language films
2010s American films
2010s Japanese films